SS Home was a steam packet ship built in 1836 and wrecked in 1837 during Racer's Storm with a loss of 90 lives. She was commanded by Captain Carleton White.

History 

Like other ships of her day, Home had masts, sails, and rigging as well.

Home was built for river trade, but was converted into a passenger ship. Her interior was paneled in deep mahogany and cherrywood with skylights, saloons, and luxurious passenger quarters. A total of US$115,000 was spent converting Home for ocean voyages, but she was equipped with only three lifeboats and two life preservers. She was uninsured.

Loss 

On Saturday, 7 October 1837, Home left New York City for Charleston, South Carolina, with about 90 passengers and 40 crew aboard. Home had made only two previous voyages to Charleston. Home struck a sandbar off New Jersey. Unaware of the extent of the damage, her captain proceeded on schedule for Charleston. She encountered the 1837 Racer's Storm and started taking on water as she rounded Cape Hatteras, North Carolina. She was put aground to ride out the developing storm. Before rescue operations could be effected the next day, the Home was torn to pieces by the surf and 90 people died.

Notable passengers lost in the disaster 
The Hardy Croom family of Tallahassee, Florida. Hardy Croom established one of Tallahassee's premier cotton plantations called Goodwood Plantation. 
Oliver H. Prince and wife Mary Prince. Oliver was on the Board of Trustees of the University of Georgia and had been a United States senator from Georgia as well as Georgia State Senator.

References
 
Biography of the SS Home's owner, James Peter Allaire
North Carolina Hurricane History
Flagpole Magazine, p. 10 (6 September 2000).
Contemporary Newspaper accounts of the loss of the Home 1837-1843

External links
 

Steamships
Shipwrecks of the Carolina coast
Maritime incidents in October 1837
1836 ships
Paddle steamers